Reel-to-reel audio tape recording is a type of audio tape recording using an open reel magnetic tape.

Reel to reel may also refer to:
 Open-reel video recording
 Reel to Reel, an album by Grand Puba
 Reel-to-reel processing, a manufacturing process involving a roll of a flexible material
 The Reel to Reel Picture Show, an America game show

See also
 Reel to Real (disambiguation)
 Real to Reel (disambiguation)